Dennis Dauda (born 15 April 1989) is a Zimbabwean footballer who plays as a defender for CAPS United F.C. and the Zimbabwe national football team.

References

External links

1989 births
Living people
CAPS United players
Zimbabwe Premier Soccer League players
Zimbabwean footballers
Zimbabwe international footballers
Association football defenders
Sportspeople from Kwekwe